Trachylepis loluiensis, also known as the Lolui Island skink, is a species of skink. It is endemic to Lolui Island in Lake Victoria, Uganda.

References

Trachylepis
Skinks of Africa
Reptiles of Uganda
Endemic fauna of Uganda
Reptiles described in 2010
Taxa named by Rungwe Kingdon
Taxa named by Stephen Spawls